The PEP Stock were prototype electric multiple units used on British Rail's Southern and Scottish Regions during the  1970s and early 1980s. They were forerunners of the British Rail Second Generation electric multiple unit fleet. Three units were built, one two-car unit (2001), and two four-car units (4001/4002). Under TOPS, the driving cars were originally classified as Class 461 with the non-driving motor cars as Class 462. They were later reclassified as Class 445 (4PEP) and Class 446 (2PEP).

Internal layout was for commuter services; low-backed, bus-style 2+2 seating in open saloons, wide gangways with hanging straps, and no lavatory facilities. They were the first electric multiple units designed by British Rail with electric sliding doors, outside the Scottish Region. They were unable to operate with any other stock due to their new coupling system. Externally, 2001 was finished in unpainted aluminium, while 4001/4002 were painted in all-over Rail Blue. In passenger use, they normally operated together as a ten-car formation.

Design
On the 4-PEP units the non-driving cars were powered, similar to London Underground practice at the time, but a departure from previous British Railways designs where there had not been any 4-car units with all axles powered. Also introduced for the first time was rheostatic braking with cam-controlled analogue logic, and fluorescent lighting working at 50 Hz. Interior design was open saloons with 2+2 seating, although this was not considered to be finalised until after trial running, and also included communicating doors between coaches and between units, with the driving cars having 2 pairs of sliding doors each and 3 pairs on the non-driving coaches.

Passenger use

All three units were initially assigned to the South Western Division of the Southern Region, based at Wimbledon Park and Strawberry Hill. Although capable of being used as a single 10-car formation on the SED, a number of failures saw them returned to the SWD after a month.

Departmental use
After the units were withdrawn from passenger service, they continued to be used by the Research department for further tests. For this purpose, the units and individual carriages were all renumbered into the departmental series. The two Class 446 power cars were teamed with a newly built pantograph trailer and became TOPS Class 920, number 920001. This was then used for the development of Classes 313-315. The two Class 445 four car sets became TOPS Class 935, numbered 056 and 057 in the Southern Region departmental (non-revenue earning) unit series. 056 saw little use, being stored at Wimbledon Park until June 1980, when it was transferred to the Railway Technical Centre at Derby.

Production classes
The production-run classes which are most visibly similar to the PEP Stock are the dual voltage 750 V DC / 25 kV AC Class 313, the 25 kV AC Classes 314 and 315, and the 750 V DC Classes 507 and 508. It was also planned that the rolling stock for the services through the proposed Picc-Vic tunnel, intended as Class 316, would have formed part of the PEP family. However, subsequent builds have also drawn heavily on the experience gained by this stock.

The PEP units had three sets of sliding doors on each of the non-driving cars for handling dense inner-suburban traffic. However, the Class 313 and all subsequent builds, including later Mark 3-based units, have only had two sets of doors per car.

Disposal

All three units were finally taken out of use in the mid-1980s. None of the cars have survived; 920001 was scrapped in 1987, 056 in 1986 and 057 in 1990.

Formations
The unit formations in passenger and departmental service were:

References

Sources

Further reading

External links

445
445
British Rail Departmental Units
Train-related introductions in 1971
750 V DC multiple units